"Po dikim stepyam Zabaikalya" is a Russian folk song, also known as "Brodyaga". It was published and recorded at the beginning of the 20th century and has since become part of the repertoire of various Russian and foreign artists.

History 

According to popular belief, the song was composed by convicts in Siberia towards the end of the 19th century. The revolutionary Ivan Belokonsky insisted, though, that it was known in Siberia in the 1880s, but there was no indication of the author of the lyrics.

According to Ivan Nazarov (and Alexander Smolik), Ivan Kondratyev was the author of the lyrics, although the poem is not included in the latter's last published volume of poems, Under the noise of the Oak Groves. In 1906, Swedish composer Wilhelm Harteveld also collected the song during his trip to Siberia and published it in 1908.

In the early 20th century, several recordings of the song were made in Russia:

 Brodyaga (From the songs of convicts) performed by Nadezhda Plevitskaya and released by Pathé Records in Moscow, 1908.
 Brodyaga (From the songs of convicts) also performed by Nadezhda Plevitskaya; Beka Records,  Moscow, 1909.
 Brodyaga (From the songs of convicts), performed by Nina Dulkevich, Pathé Records, 1912. 21, исп. Нина Дулькевич.

All these releases credit Ivan Kondratyev as the author of the lyrics.

Lyrics 
There are several versions, which differ slightly in words or expressions. Most musicians omit some verses. The following is the most common version.  (The verses in italics are those most often omitted):

Recent performances 

The song remains in the repertoire of various Russian artists. The best known performances include those by:
 Pyatnitsky Choir (numerous versions)
 The Siberian Russian Folk Choir conducted by V. Molchalov, soloist Yelena Ponomaryova.
 Voronezh Russian Folk Choir
 Aleksandr Mikhaylov 
 Yuri Sorokin (1980s)
 Zhanna Bichevskaya
 Andrey Makarevich (1996)
 Mongol Shuudan (2004)
 Chaif (2009)

Performance abroad 

The first recording outside the USSR was by Electrecord in Bucharest, Romania in 1945 and released as "Brodyaga". It was performed by Pyotr Leshchenko, a Russian singer who had emigrated to Romania.

The song has also been performed by foreign artists, including:

 Czesław Niemen (Poland)
 Bernard Ładysz (Poland)
 Jaroslaw Jaromi Drazewski (Poland)
 Artur Gadowski (Poland)
 Piotr Celiński (Poland)
 Baltie Lāči group (Latvia)
 Zivan Saramandic (Serbia)
 Zura Pirveli (Georgia)

Films 

The song was featured in the Russian movie Ballad of Siberia, performed by actor Vladimir Druzhnikov, being a secondary theme song.

Spinoffs 

A parody of the song called "On the wild steppes of Arizona", with lyrics by Viktor Baranov performed by Artur Gladyshev. The song was released in 1997 in the album "Red America" .

References

External links 
 https://web.archive.org/web/20150519020640/http://www.oldchita.org/songs/216-2011-04-22-15-26-55.html

Russian folk songs